Rothilena is a genus of North American funnel weavers first described by J. Maya-Morales & M. L. Jiménez in 2013.

Species
 it contains six species, all found in Mexico:

Rothilena cochimi Maya-Morales & Jiménez, 2013 – Mexico
Rothilena golondrina Maya-Morales & Jiménez, 2013 – Mexico
Rothilena griswoldi Maya-Morales & Jiménez, 2013 – Mexico
Rothilena naranjensis Maya-Morales & Jiménez, 2013 – Mexico
Rothilena pilar Maya-Morales & Jiménez, 2013 – Mexico
Rothilena sudcaliforniensis Maya-Morales & Jiménez, 2013 – Mexico

References

External links

Agelenidae
Araneomorphae genera
Spiders of Mexico